Venus in Tweeds, an album by Shooglenifty, was released in 1995 on the Greentrax Recordings label.

Track listing
 "The Pipe Tunes: John McKenzie's Fancy/The Kitchen Piper" – 4:55
 "Horace: The Grampian Television Jig/Horace Show of Highfield/The Old Woman's Dance" – 5:05
 "The Point Road" – 3:15
 "Venus in Tweeds" – 4:04
 "Waiting for Conrad" – 5:42
 "Two Fifty to Vigo" – 4:52
 "Paranoia: Paranoia/Flapper's Reel" – 5:49
 "Buying a Blanket: Buying a Blanket/Murphy the Mousecatcher" – 4:24
 "The Tammienorrie: The Tammienorie/Leo Elsey's Reel/Les Reel des Voyageurs" – 5:17
 "The Point Road – Joiner's Mix" – 3:25

Sources and links

Shooglenifty albums
1995 albums